Karnah Assembly constituency is one of the 87 constituencies in the Jammu and Kashmir Legislative Assembly of Jammu and Kashmir a north state of India. Karnah is also part of Baramulla Lok Sabha constituency.

Member of Legislative Assembly

 1962: Mohammed Yunis Khan, Indian National Congress
 1967: Mohammed Yunis Khan, Indian National Congress
 1972: Mohammed Yaseen Shah, Independent
 1977: Ghulam Qadir Mir, Jammu & Kashmir National Conference
 1983: Abdul Gani Lone, Jammu & Kashmir National Conference
 1987: Sharifuddin Shariq, Jammu & Kashmir National Conference
 1996: Kafil Ur Rehman, Jammu & Kashmir National Conference
 2002: Kafil Ur Rehman, Jammu & Kashmir National Conference
 2008: Kafil Ur Rehman, Jammu & Kashmir National Conference

Election results

2014

See also
 Karnah
 Kupwara district
 List of constituencies of Jammu and Kashmir Legislative Assembly

References

Assembly constituencies of Jammu and Kashmir
Kupwara district